Geddes is a historic home located near Clifford, Amherst County, Virginia.  It was built in several stages between about 1762 and the mid-19th century.  It is a -story, Colonial era frame house of post and beam construction with a hipped roof.  It is referred to as the oldest house in Amherst County by area residents.  Its builder, Hugh Rose, is best remembered as the friend of Thomas Jefferson who looked after Jefferson's family at Geddes during the British raid on Charlottesville in 1781.

It was added to the National Register of Historic Places in 1983.

References

Houses in Amherst County, Virginia
Houses completed in 1762
Colonial architecture in Virginia
Houses on the National Register of Historic Places in Virginia
National Register of Historic Places in Amherst County, Virginia